First National Bank of Seaford is a historic bank building located at Seaford, Sussex County, Delaware. It was built in 1868, and is a two-story, five bay, rectangular brick structure in the Italianate style.  It has a hipped roof with dormers and a two-story, frame addition.  It is the oldest standing bank building
in Seaford and has been converted to apartments.

It was added to the National Register of Historic Places in 1987.

References

Bank buildings on the National Register of Historic Places in Delaware
Italianate architecture in Delaware
Commercial buildings completed in 1868
Banks based in Delaware
Buildings and structures in Sussex County, Delaware
Defunct banks of the United States
Seaford, Delaware
National Register of Historic Places in Sussex County, Delaware